Yuxarı Qaragüvəndli (also, Yukhary Karagyuvyandli and Yukhary-Karakyuvendikly) is a village in the Imishli Rayon of Azerbaijan.

References 

Populated places in Imishli District